"Baby I'm-a Want You" is a song by American soft rock band Bread. The single was released in October 1971 and became the title track for the album of the same name, released in January 1972.

It was one of Bread's highest-charting singles in both the U.S. and UK. In the U.S., it reached No. 3 on the Billboard Hot 100 chart in November 1971, the third of Bread's four top-five hits ("Make It with You", No. 1 in 1970; "If", No. 4 earlier in 1971; and "Everything I Own", from the same album, No. 5 in 1972). "Baby I'm-a Want You" reached the top of the Easy Listening chart and rose to No. 14 on the UK Singles Chart in February 1972.

It was certified as a gold record by the RIAA. As with virtually all of the band's well-known recordings, the song was both written and produced by the band's lead vocalist, David Gates.

Chart history

Weekly charts

Year-end charts

See also
List of number-one adult contemporary singles of 1971 (U.S.)

References

Whitburn, Joel (1996). The Billboard Book of Top 40 Hits, 6th Edition (Billboard Publications)

External links
Song info at discogs.com
UK chart info at Official Charts Company

1971 songs
1971 singles
Bread (band) songs
Elektra Records singles
Songs written by David Gates
1970s ballads